William Finch may refer to:

William Finch (bishop) (died 1559), bishop of Taunton
William Finch (merchant) (died 1613), English merchant
William Finch (diplomat) (1691–1766), British diplomat and politician
William Finch (Bampton lecturer) (1747–1810), English clergyman
William Finch (politician) (1832–1911), first African American elected to serve on the Atlanta City Council 
William Clement Finch (1753–1794), British admiral and MP for Surrey
William Finch (captain) of the SS Arabic (1902)
William Coles Finch (1864–1944), British historian
William R. Finch (1847–1913), United States diplomat

See also
Alfred William Finch (1854–1930), ceramist and painter
Bill Finch (disambiguation)